Ian Robinson may refer to:

Ian Robinson (Australian football umpire) (born 1946), Australian Football League umpire active in the 1970s and 1980s
Ian Robinson (Australian politician) (1925–2017), Australian MP
Ian Robinson (author) (1937–2020), British literary critic
Ian Robinson (cricket umpire) (1947–2016), Zimbabwean cricket umpire active from 1992 to 2004
Ian Robinson (publisher) (1934–2004), writer, artist and editor of Oasis Books
Ian Robinson (rationalist) (born 1940), president of the Rationalist Society of Australia
Ian Robinson (squash player) (born 1952), former English professional squash player
Ian Robinson (rugby league), rugby league footballer of the 1970s, and 1980s
Ian Robinson, member of Black Lace